Burglinde Pollak (later Grimm, born 10 June 1951) is a retired German pentathlete. She won bronze medals at the 1972 and 1976 Olympics and finished sixth in 1980. At the European championships she won three silver medals, in 1971, 1974 and 1978. Pollak set three world records, in 1970, 1972 and 1973. After retiring from competitions she worked as a physiotherapist at her own clinic.

References

1951 births
Living people
People from Werder (Havel)
East German heptathletes
Sportspeople from Brandenburg
Olympic athletes of East Germany
Athletes (track and field) at the 1972 Summer Olympics
Athletes (track and field) at the 1976 Summer Olympics
Athletes (track and field) at the 1980 Summer Olympics
Olympic bronze medalists for East Germany
European Athletics Championships medalists
Medalists at the 1976 Summer Olympics
Medalists at the 1972 Summer Olympics
Olympic bronze medalists in athletics (track and field)
People from Bezirk Potsdam